Imbricariopsis vanikorensis, common name the Vanikoro mitre,  is a species of sea snail, a marine gastropod mollusk in the family Mitridae, the miters or miter snails.

Description
The length of the shell varies between 9 mm and 20 mm.

Distribution
This marine species occurs in the Red Sea and Southern Japan;also off Vanikoro, the Solomons and Fiji.

References

External links
 Quoy J.R.C. & Gaimard J.P. (1832-1835). Voyage de découvertes de l'"Astrolabe" exécuté par ordre du Roi, pendant les années 1826-1829, sous le commandement de M. J. Dumont d'Urville. Zoologie. 1: i-l, 1-264; 2(1): 1-321 [1832; 2(2): 321-686 [1833]; 3(1): 1-366 [1834]; 3(2): 367-954 [1835]; Atlas (Mollusques): pls 1-93 [1833]. Paris: Tastu]
 Fedosov A., Puillandre N., Herrmann M., Kantor Yu., Oliverio M., Dgebuadze P., Modica M.V. & Bouchet P. (2018). The collapse of Mitra: molecular systematics and morphology of the Mitridae (Gastropoda: Neogastropoda). Zoological Journal of the Linnean Society. 183(2): 253-337

Mitridae
Gastropods described in 1833